CISS-FM (105.3 MHz) is a commercial FM radio station in Ottawa, Ontario. The station is owned by Rogers Media and broadcasts a hot adult contemporary format branded on-air as KiSS 105.3. The radio studios and offices are co-located with its sister stations at Thurston Drive and Conroy Road.

CISS-FM has an effective radiated power (ERP) of 84,000 watts. The transmitter is in Camp Fortune, Quebec, within Gatineau Park.

History
The station signed on the air in 1972 with the call sign CKBY, playing a country format.

On January 9, 2004, the station adopted a hot adult contemporary format and the 105.3 KISS-FM moniker. The station launched with Pink's "Get The Party Started". A month later after the format change, the station adopted its current call letters. The CISS call sign previously belonged to a Toronto radio station, also owned by Rogers, which now uses the call letters CKIS-FM. The CKBY calls, in turn, were moved to a third Rogers station in Smiths Falls. In the station's early years, the station's playlist was similar to that of CHUM-FM in Toronto, but with a less rhythmic lean. Later that year, it shifted from Hot AC to adult top 40.

CISS came at the expense of 101.1 XFM, (CIOX-FM) an alternative rock station that was shut down to make way for KISS and for a move of country radio Y105, to 101.1 FM as Y101 (currently Country 92.3 as of December 2020), to another frequency. The two morning show hosts of XFM, Mauler and Rush, were temporarily left unemployed. They have since moved to The Morning Hot Tub on CIHT-FM, which is also simulcast on other Stingray Group stations across Canada.

With the flip of the former CISS in Toronto from "Jack FM" to top 40 as KiSS 92.5 on June 5, 2009, the CISS calls remained unchanged on this station. Instead, Rogers swapped the CJAQ-FM calls in Toronto with the former CKIS-FM (a "Jack" station) in Calgary.

More recently, as of the fall of 2009, CISS has begun to lean more rhythmic again and dropped most modern adult contemporary artists.

As of 2011, the station has eliminated the majority of its pre-1999 playlist and moved towards a more 2000s-now direction. A new logo was added, along with adding the tagline "The New" in its "KISS-FM" branding. The station leans heavily on rhythmic material, especially during nights and weekends, when the station plays songs that other Hot AC stations in Canada won't play, more in the style of a CHR station and to compete with CIHT. However, CIHT still plays pre-1999 music, and continues to beat Kiss in ratings by a large margin, though CISS's ratings have improved slightly since the addition of rhythmic material. As of March 31, 2014, CISS also picked up more competition in the form of CKQB, which flipped from active rock to a Top 40/CHR presentation that heavily favours current rhythmic and dance product aimed at young adult and teen listeners. Despite the Top 40 competition from both CIHT and CKQB, CISS, however, remains on the Canadian hot AC panels of Mediabase & Nielsen BDS.

By early 2016, CISS re-branded slightly to KiSS 105.3.

In September 2016, CISS re-added 1990s music to their playlist and changed the slogan to "The Most Variety from the 90s to Now."

In August 2021, CISS re-branded as "The Capital's KiSS 105.3", and changed their slogan to "90's, 2000's, Now!"

References

External links 

 

ISS
ISS
ISS
Radio stations established in 1972
1972 establishments in Ontario